Brian William Green (born 15 May 1941 in Ormskirk) is a British former sprinter.

Background 
Green attended Walton Grammar School and worked as an advertising assistant.

He came to sprinting late, having previously divided his time between other sporting interests including squash, badminton, and hockey.

Sprinting career 
Standing at  Green was once told he was too short to be a sprinter. Despite this, at the age of 31, Green became the fastest man in Britain, recording a time of 10.1 seconds in Bratislava.

Green competed in the 1972 Summer Olympics. He represented England and won a bronze medallist at the 1970 British Commonwealth Games in the 4×100 metres relay. He represented England in the sprint events, at the 1974 British Commonwealth Games in Christchurch, New Zealand and represented England in the 100 metres and 100 metres relay events, at the 1978 Commonwealth Games in Edmonton, Alberta, Canada.

References

1941 births
Living people
People from Ormskirk
Sportspeople from Lancashire
British male sprinters
English male sprinters
Olympic athletes of Great Britain
Athletes (track and field) at the 1972 Summer Olympics
Commonwealth Games bronze medallists for England
Commonwealth Games medallists in athletics
Athletes (track and field) at the 1970 British Commonwealth Games
Athletes (track and field) at the 1974 British Commonwealth Games
Athletes (track and field) at the 1978 Commonwealth Games
Medallists at the 1970 British Commonwealth Games